Ceccarini is an Italian surname. Notable people with the surname include:

Andrea Ceccarini (born 1964), Italian swimmer
Lucio Ceccarini (1930–2009), Italian water polo player
Matteo Ceccarini (born 1972), Italian DJ, composer and sound designer
Piero Ceccarini (born 1953), Italian football referee
Sebastiano Ceccarini (1703–1783), Italian Baroque painter

Italian-language surnames